Karosa LC 936 is a long-distance coach produced by bus manufacturer Karosa from the Czech Republic, in the years 1996 to 2002. In 1999 was introduced modernised version LC 936 E and LC 936 XE. It was succeeded by Karosa LC 956 in 2002.

Construction features 
Karosa LC 936 is model of Karosa 900 series. LC 936 is unified with intercity bus models such as C 934 and B 932. Body is semi-self-supporting with frame and engine with manual gearbox is placed in the rear part. Only rear axle is propulsed. Front axle is independent, rear axle is solid. All axles are mounted on air suspension. On the right side are two doors. Inside are used high padded seats. Drivers cab is not separated from the rest of the vehicle.

Production and operation 
In the year 1996 started serial production, which continued until 2002. Since 1999 were buses produced only in modernised version LC 936 E and LC 936 XE.

Currently, number of Karosa LC 936 buses is decreasing, due to high age of buses.

Historical vehicles 
Any historical vehicle was not saved yet.

See also 

 List of buses

References

External links 

  Info and images of Karosa LC 936 operated in Prague
  Photogallery of LC 936 buses

Buses manufactured by Karosa
Buses of the Czech Republic